The Côte de granite rose or Pink Granite Coast is a stretch of coastline in the Côtes d'Armor departement of northern Brittany, France. It stretches for more than thirty kilometres from Plestin-les-Grèves to Louannec, encompassing Trégastel.

It has become a popular tourist destination due to its unusual pink sands and rock formations.

References 

Granite Rose
Tourist attractions in Côtes-d'Armor
Geography of Côtes-d'Armor